Riverside County Elite were an American soccer team established in 1998 that spent the 2000 season in the USISL D-3 Pro League.

History
In 1998, Jack Fielding founded the Riverside County Elite as a U-21 team with the intention of eventually entering it into the USISL.  He and his wife created the Riverside Soccer Development Corporation and entered into a partnership with the San Diego Soccer Development Corporation which operated the San Diego Flash.  Fielding initially owned, operated and coached the team.  In late 1999, Jan K. Skwara became the club CEO.  In January 2000, the team hired Tom Evans as head coach.  On April 16, 2000, the team replaced Evans with Rob Manriquez.  In May 2000, it qualified for the U.S. Open Cup.  The team played its home games at West Valley High School in Hemet, California.  Although successful on the field, the team never drew many fans and finished the season deeply in debt.  Owner Jack Fielding folded the club in December 2000.

 Tim Gorman

MF:
Pompeyo Aguillera
Jeremy Baker
Omar Arzo
Jauquin Cubarubias
  Sergio Cuevas
  Oscar Romo
 Juan Carlos Rocha
 Alex Gutierrez
 Cesar Garcia (Colton CA.)
  Danny Christ #17
DF
  Neil Armour
Alex Glebou
  Danny Macedo
  Joe Owen
  Craig Dean #4
 Cody Freas
  Ryan Meinhart

FW
  Donald Laing
Brad Thomson
  Mauricio Bertello
Antonio Robles
  Danny Mann
William Cummins
  Bryan Hill

Staff
 Cle Kooiman: Director of coaching
 Tom Evans: Head coach
 Rob Manriquez: Head coach
 Pompeyo Aguillera: Assistant coach
 Neil Armour: Assistant coach
 Mike Christ: Assistant coach

Year-by-year

References

External links
 USISL Division III (D3) Professional League: Riverside County Elite
 2000 USISL D-3 Pro League

Defunct soccer clubs in California
USL Second Division teams
Hemet, California
Sports in Riverside County, California
1998 establishments in California
2000 disestablishments in California
Soccer clubs in California
Association football clubs established in 1998
Association football clubs disestablished in 2000